Cleisostoma aspersum is a species of orchid found in Bhutan, India, Myanmar, Thailand and Vietnam.

References

External links 

aspersum
Orchids of Bhutan
Orchids of India
Orchids of Thailand
Orchids of Vietnam